The 2016 SMU Mustangs football team represented Southern Methodist University in the 2016 NCAA Division I FBS football season. The Mustangs played their home games at Gerald J. Ford Stadium in University Park, Texas, and competed in the West Division of American Athletic Conference (AAC). They were led by second-year head coach Chad Morris. They finished the season 5–7, 3–5 in American Athletic play to finish in fifth place in the West Division.

Schedule

Schedule Source:

Game summaries

at North Texas

at Baylor

Liberty

TCU

at Temple

at Tulsa

Houston

at Tulane

Memphis

at East Carolina

South Florida

Navy

Roster

References

SMU
SMU Mustangs football seasons
SMU Mustangs football